Holyoak is a surname. Notable people with the name include:

Keith Holyoak, (born 1950) cognitive psychologist
Percy Hobson Holyoak (1874–1926), British businessman in Hong Kong 
Warren Holyoak (born 1934), Australian rules footballer 
Neil Holyoak, musician under the stage name Holy Oak

See also
Holyoake (surname)
Holyoke (disambiguation)
Holly oak (disambiguation)